Salishicetus is an extinct genus of aetiocetid baleen whale from the Late Oligocene discovered in Washington state with one species: S. meadi. Like other ancient baleen whales, Salishicetus had teeth, and used these for either suction feeding or to catch large prey. The name refers to the Salish Sea, which it was found near, which itself honors the Salish tribes of the Pacific Northwest region.

References

Aetiocetidae
Oligocene cetaceans
Oligocene mammals of North America
Prehistoric cetacean genera
Fossil taxa described in 2018